The St. Paul's Lutheran Church near Hazen, North Dakota, United States, was built in 1921. It was listed on the National Register of Historic Places in 2005.

A congregation formed in 1889 of German-Russian immigrants had 29 members.  In 1902 they decided to build the church.

References

Churches completed in 1921
German-Russian culture in North Dakota
Churches on the National Register of Historic Places in North Dakota
Romanesque Revival church buildings in North Dakota
National Register of Historic Places in Mercer County, North Dakota
1921 establishments in North Dakota
Lutheran churches in North Dakota